Macau is scheduled to compete in the 2017 Asian Winter Games in Sapporo and Obihiro, Japan from February 19 to 26. The country is scheduled to compete in one sport: ice hockey. The Macanese team consists of 23 athletes.

Background
Macau is scheduled to return to competition after missing the last edition of the games in 2011. The country has only competed in one sport at the games: hockey.

Competitors
The following table lists the Macanese delegation per sport and gender.

Ice hockey

Macau has entered a men's hockey team. The team is scheduled to compete in division 2. Macau finished in fourth place (14th place overall) in division 2 of the competition.

Men's tournament

Macau was represented by the following 23 athletes:

Chu Te-lin (G)
Tong Chang-wa (G)
Vong Wai-tong (G)
Chan Chi-kit (D)
Chon Ka-miu (D)
Ho Chon-nin (D)
Iun Chi-fong (D)
Kong Chong-man (D)
Lai Neng (D)
Leong Chon-kong (D)
Chan Ka-lok (F)
Fong Chou-tek (F)
Fong Keng-lam (F)
Guan Chentao (F)
Lei Meng-chi (F)
Jonay Leung (F)
Mok Kim-hei (F)
Mok Kim-kei (F)
Pong Ka-kit (F)
Shinoda Katsuyoshi (F)
Tam Weng-leong (F)
U Chi-fong (F)
Un Kin-fai (F)

Legend: G = Goalie, D = Defense, F = Forward
Group B

13th place match

References

Nations at the 2017 Asian Winter Games
Asian Winter Games
Macau at the Asian Winter Games